J. M. Coetzee (born 9 February 1940) is a South African-born novelist, essayist, linguist, translator and recipient of the 2003 Nobel Prize in Literature. He has also won the Booker Prize twice, the Jerusalem Prize, CNA Prize (thrice), the Prix Femina étranger, The Irish Times International Fiction Prize, as well as many other awards and honours, and he holds a number of honorary doctorates and is one of the most acclaimed and decorated authors in the English language.

Novels

 Dusklands (1974) 
 In the Heart of the Country (1977) 
 Waiting for the Barbarians (1980) 
 Life & Times of Michael K (1983) 
 Foe (1986) 
 Age of Iron (1990) 
 The Master of Petersburg (1994) 
 Disgrace (1999) 
 Elizabeth Costello (2003) 
 Slow Man (2005) 
 Diary of a Bad Year (2007) 
 The Childhood of Jesus (2013) 
 The Schooldays of Jesus (2016) 
 The Death of Jesus (2019) 
 The Pole (2022)

Autobiographical novels

 Boyhood: Scenes from Provincial Life (1997) 
 Youth: Scenes from Provincial Life II (2002) 
 Summertime (2009) 
 Scenes from Provincial Life (2011) . An edited single volume of Boyhood: Scenes from Provincial Life, Youth: Scenes from Provincial Life II, and Summertime.

Short fiction

Collections
 The Lives of Animals (Princeton, NJ: Princeton University Press, 1999) 
 Three Stories (Melbourne: Text Publishing, 2014) 
 Siete cuentos morales (Barcelona: El Hilo de Ariadna/Literatura Random House, 2018), translated into Spanish from the unpublished manuscript Moral Tales. Moral Tales has also been translated into French and Italian and released as L'abattoir de verre (translated by Georges Lory. Paris: Éditions du Seuil, 2018) and Bugie e altri racconti morali (Torino: Giulio Enaudi Editori, 2019). A Japanese translation, by Nozomi Kubota, was published in 2018 (Kyoto: Jimbun Shoin).

Stories

Criticism

 Truth in Autobiography (Cape Town: University of Cape Town Press, 1984)
 White Writing: On the Culture of Letters in South Africa (New Haven, CT: Yale University Press, 1988) 
 Doubling the Point: Essays and Interviews, ed. David Attwell (Cambridge, MA: Harvard University Press, 1992) 
 Giving Offense: Essays on Censorship (Chicago, IL: University of Chicago Press, 1996) 
 The Novel in Africa (Berkeley: Doreen B. Townsend Center for the Humanities, 1999)
 Stranger Shores: Literary Essays, 1986–1999 (London: Secker & Warburg, 2001) 
 Inner Workings: Literary Essays, 2000–2005 (London: Harvill Secker, 2007) 
 Here and Now: Letters, 2008-2011 (New York, NY: Viking, 2013) , a collection of letters exchanged with Paul Auster
 The Good Story: Exchanges on Truth, Fiction and Psychotherapy, with Arabella Kurtz (New York, NY: Viking, 2015) 
 Late Essays: 2006-2017 (London: Harvill Secker, 2017)

Translations and introductions

 A Posthumous Confession by Marcellus Emants (Boston: Twayne, 1976 & London: Quartet, 1986). Translated and Introduced by J. M. Coetzee. 
 The Expedition to the Baobab Tree by Wilma Stockenström (Johannesburg: Jonathan Ball, 1983 & London: Faber, 1984). Translated by J. M. Coetzee. 
 Landscape with Rowers: Poetry from the Netherlands  (Princeton, NJ: Princeton University Press, 2004). Translated and Introduced by J. M. Coetzee 
 Introduction to Robinson Crusoe by Daniel Defoe (Oxford World's Classics) 
 Introduction to Brighton Rock by Graham Greene (Penguin Classics) 
 Introduction to Dangling Man by Saul Bellow (Penguin Classics) 
 Introduction to The Vivisector by Patrick White (Penguin, 1999) 
 Introduction to The Confusions of Young Törless by Robert Musil (Penguin Classics, 2001) 
 Introduction to Samuel Beckett: The Grove Centenary Edition vol. IV by Samuel Beckett, edited by Paul Auster (New York: Grove Press, 2006) 
 Foreword to Africa and Her Animals: Philosophical and Practical Perspectives, edited by Rainer Ebert & Anteneh Roba (Pretoria: University of South Africa Press, 2018)

Interviews
 "Speaking J. M. Coetzee", Stephen Watson, Speak vol. 1, no. 3 (1978): 21–24.
 "An Interview with J. M. Coetzee", Tony Morphet, Social Dynamics vol. 10, no. 1 (1984): 62-65.
 "An Interview with J. M. Coetzee", Jean Sévry, Commonwealth: Essays and Studies vol. 9, no. 1 (1986): 1–7.
 "Two Interviews with J. M. Coetzee, 1983 and 1987," Tony Morphet, TriQuarterly 69 (Spring-Summer 1987): 454–64.
 "On the Question of Autobiography: Interview with J. M. Coetzee", David Attwell, Current Writing: Text and Reception in South Africa vol. 3, no. 1 (1991): 117–122.
 "An Interview with J. M. Coetzee", Richard Begam, Contemporary Literature vol. 33, no. 3 (1992): 419–431.
 "An Interview with J. M. Coetzee", World Literature Today vol. 70, no. 1 (1996): 107–110.
 "Voice and Trajectory: An Interview with J. M. Coetzee", Joanna Scott, Salmagundi 114/115 (1997): 82–102.
 "The Sympathetic Imagination: A Conversation with J. M. Coetzee", Eleanor Wachtel, Brick: A Literary Journal 56 (2001): 37–47.
 "A Rare Interview with a Literary Giant", Michael Shechner, Buffalo News Oct. 13, 2002, page E1.
 "An Exclusive Interview with J. M. Coetzee", David Attwell, Dagens Nyheter, Dec. 8, 2003
 "Animals, Humans, and Cruelty", Djurens Rätt, 2004
 "An Interview with J. M. Coetzee", Erik Grayson, Stirrings Still vol. 3, no. 1 (2006): 4–7.
 "All Autobiography is Autre-biography", David Atwell, in Selves in Question: Interviews on South African Auto/biography, ed. Judith Lütge Coullie et al. (Honolulu, HI: University of Hawai'i Press, 2006), 213–218.
 "The Canadian Seal Hunt: An Interview with J. M. Coetzee", The Humane Society of the United States, Mar. 14, 2008 
 "Nevertheless, My Sympathies are with the Karamazovs: An Email Correspondence: May – December 2008", Arabella Kurtz, Salmagundi 166/167 (Spring 2010): 39–72.
 "An Interview with J. M. Coetzee", Lawrence Rainey, David Attwell, and Benjamin Madden, Modernism/Modernity vol. 18, no. 4 (2011): 847–853.
 "... A Certain Age ...", Lore Watterson, Classicfeel Dec/Jan (2012–13): 22–29.
 "El Nobel que quiere unir las letras del Sur", Clarín, Aug. 9, 2017

Biography

Film and television adaptations

 Dust, dir. Marion Hänsel (1985). An adaptation of In the Heart of the Country.
 The Lives of Animals, dir. Alex Harvey (2002).
 De Muze / The Muse, dir. Ben van Lieshout (2007). An adaptation of Youth: Scenes from Provincial Life II.
 Disgrace, dir. Steve Jacobs (2008).
 While the above four adaptations were not written by him, Coetzee has penned screenplays for In the Heart of the Country and Waiting for the Barbarians. Though these had not been produced as of their publishing, they are in J.M. Coetzee: Two Screenplays, ed. Hermann Wittenberg (Cape Town: University of Cape Town Press, 2014) 
 Waiting for the Barbarians, dir. Ciro Guerra (2019). Coetzee is credited with writing the screenplay.

Collaborations

In 2012, Coetzee wrote the libretto for the opera Slow Man by Nicholas Lens, based on his novel Slow Man. The opera was given its world premiere on 5 July 2012 at the Malta Festival, Grand Theatre, Poznań

Critical studies of Coetzee's work
Monographs
 
 
 
 
 
 
 
 
 
 
 
 
 
 
 
 
 
 
 
 Lazo Pablo, J.M. Coetzee. Los imaginarios de la Resistencia, Akal, España, 2017. 

 
 
 
 
 
 
 
 Wiegandt, Kai (2020). J. M. Coetzee's Revisions of the Human: Posthumanism and Narrative Form. Cham: Palgrave Macmillan, 2020. .
Moody, Alys (2018). The Art of Hunger: Aesthetic Autonomy and the Afterlives of Modernism. Oxford: Oxford University Press. ISBN 978-0-19-882889-1
Attwell, David (2015). J. M. Coetzee & the Life of Writing: Face to Face with Time. Oxford: Oxford University Press. ISBN 978-0-19-874633-1
Attridge, Derek (2004). J. M. Coetzee and the Ethics of Reading: Literature in the Event. Chicago: Chicago University Press. ISBN 0-226-03116-0
Hayes, Patrick (201). J. M. Coetzee and the Novel: Writing and Politics After Beckett. Oxford: Oxford University Press. ISBN 978-0-19-958795-7
Dean, Andrew (2021). Metafiction and the Postwar Novel: Foes, Ghosts and Faces in the Water. Oxford: Oxford University Press. ISBN 978-0-19-887140-8
Collected essays
 The Writings of J. M. Coetzee, ed. Michael Valdez Moses (Durham, NC: Duke University Press, 1994).
 Critical perspectives on J. M. Coetzee, eds. Graham Huggan and Stephen Watson (New York, NY: St. Martin's Press, 1996).
 Critical Essays on J. M. Coetzee, ed. Sue Kossew (New York, NY: G.K. Hall, 1998).
 A Universe of (Hi)stories: Essays on J. M. Coetzee, ed. Liliana Sikorska (Frankfurt am Main; New York, NY: Peter Lang, 2006).
 J. M. Coetzee and the Idea of the Public Intellectual, ed. Jane Poyner (Athens, OH: Ohio University Press, 2006).
 J. M. Coetzee: Critical Perspectives, ed. Kailash C. Baral (New Delhi: Pencraft, 2008).
 J. M. Coetzee in Context and Theory, eds. Elleke Boehmer, Katy Iddiols, and Robert Eaglestone (London; New York, NY: Continuum, 2009).
 J. M. Coetzee's Austerities, eds. Graham Bradshaw and Michael Neill (Surrey; Burlington, VT: Ashgate, 2010).
 J. M. Coetzee and Ethics: Philosophical Perspectives on Literature, eds. Anton Leist and Peter Singer (New York, NY: Columbia University Press, 2010).
 A Companion to the Works of J. M. Coetzee, eds. Tim Mehigan (Rochester: Camden House, 2011).
 Strong Opinions: J. M. Coetzee and the Authority of Contemporary fiction, eds. Chris Danta, Sue Kossew, and Julian Murphet (New York, NY: Routledge, 2011).
 Approaches to Teaching Coetzee's 'Disgrace' and Other Works, eds. Laura Wright, Jane Poyner, and Elleke Boehmer (The Modern Language Association of America, 2014).
 J. M. Coetzee’s The Childhood of Jesus: The Ethics of Ideas and Things, eds. Anthony Uhlmann and Jennifer Rutherford (London: Bloomsbury, 2017).
 Beyond the Ancient Quarrel: Literature, Philosophy, and J. M. Coetzee, eds. Patrick Hayes and Jan Wilm (Oxford: Oxford University Press, 2017).
 The Intellectual Landscape in the Works of J. M. Coetzee, eds. Tim Mehigan and Christian Moser (Columbia, MD: Boydell & Brewer, 2018).
 The Cambridge Companion to J.M. Coetzee, ed. Jarad Zimbler (Cambridge: Cambridge University Press, 2020).

Notes

Bibliographies by writer
Bibliographies of Australian writers
Bibliographies of South African writers